

Adherbal, son of Micipsa and grandson of Masinissa, was a king of Numidia between 118 and 112 BC.  He inherited the throne after the death of his father, and ruled jointly with his younger brother Hiempsal, and Jugurtha, the nephew of Masinissa.  After the murder of his brother by Jugurtha, Adherbal fled to Rome and was restored to his share of the kingdom by the Romans in 117 BC, with Jugurtha ruling his brother's former share.  But Adherbal was again stripped of his dominions by Jugurtha and besieged in Cirta, where he was killed by Jugurtha in 112 BC, although he had placed himself under the protection of the Romans.

François Joseph Lagrange-Chancel's 1694 French play Adherbal, King of Numidia is based on his story.

See also
List of Kings of Numidia

References

Citations

Bibliography
 . 

112 BC deaths
2nd-century BC rulers in Africa
2nd-century BC Berber people
Kings of Numidia
Year of birth missing